Tidar (also Romanized as Tīdar; also known as Tūdar) is a village in Fareghan Rural District, Fareghan District, Hajjiabad County, Hormozgan Province, Iran. At the 2006 census, its population was 192, in 75 families.

References 

Populated places in Hajjiabad County